Randy McClanahan (born December 12, 1954 in Lincoln, Nebraska) is a former professional American football player who played linebacker for five seasons for the Oakland / Los Angeles Raiders and Buffalo Bills.

1954 births
Sportspeople from Lincoln, Nebraska
Players of American football from Nebraska
American football linebackers
Louisiana Ragin' Cajuns football players
Los Angeles Raiders players
Oakland Raiders players
Buffalo Bills players
Living people